The Rebellion of the Pilots was a military uprising carried out by six members of the Dominican Military Aviation (today the Dominican Air Force) on November 19, 1961 that put a definitive end to the rule of 31 years of the Trujillo dictatorship by forcing the exile of the Trujillo family from the country.  It prevented Ramfis Trujillo, José Arismendy Trujillo and Héctor Bienvenido Trujillo Molina from returning to power and restoring the regime led by their brother Rafael Trujillo.

The timely rebellion marked the end of one of the bloodiest dictatorships of the twentieth century and the beginning of democracy in the Dominican Republic, preventing the elimination of the political class that opposed the Trujillo regime.

Assassination of dictator Rafael Leonidas Trujillo 
The persecution, reprisals and torture to which the Dominican people were subjected for 31 years began their end when the night of May 30, 1961, Juan Tomás Díaz, his brother Modesto Díaz, Antonio de la Maza, Antonio Imbert Barrera, Salvador Estrella Sadhalá, Amado García Guerrero, Huáscar Tejeda, Pedro Livio Cedeño, Luis Amiama Tio, Luis Manuel Cáceres Michel and Roberto Pastoriza Neret executed the dictator Rafael Leónidas Trujillo.

With the execution of the dictator began the decapitation of Trujillo dictatorship. However, the machinery that supported the dictatorship remained almost intact, so democracy took time to build. The Dominican Republic suffered for 5 months and 19 days, the cruelest barbarism suffered during the 30 years and months that the Trujillo dictatorship lasted, increasing the crimes, torture, abuse, cancellations and dispossession of property to the Dominicans.

Of the group responsible for Trujillo's assassination only General Imbert Barrera and Luis Amiama Tio survived; the other nine were killed by Ramfis Trujillo, the son of the tyrant, and the remnants of the regime. On November 18, 1961 Ramfis Trujillo murdered six of those men in the Hacienda María Massacre in San Cristobal.

The Rebellion of the Pilots- November 19th, 1961 
The uprising of the Rebellion of the Pilots took place on the morning of November 19, 1961. The artillery and the tank squadrons of the San Isidro Air Base were bombed, as well as other military installations that remained loyal to Trujillo such as the Mao and Puerto Plata fortresses. These attacks succeeded in disabling the military forces that supported the Trujillo and achieved the definitive exit from the country of the Trujillo remnants.

On the night of November 18 Petán Trujillo, the Air Force chief, had met at the San Isidro Air Base with Tunti Sánchez, and the regional chiefs of the dreaded Military Intelligence Service (SIM), including Alicinio Peña Rivera, who would kill the politicians and antitrujillistas of the Cibao region. This plan was called Operation Green Light or the Massacre of San Bartolomé whose objective was serial murders of leaders like Viriato Fiallo, Joaquin Balaguer, among others.

The Rebellion of the Pilots was devised and executed by Lieutenant Colonels Manuel Durán Guzmán, ideologue of the plot, Raymundo Polanco Alegría, commander of the Ramfis Hunting Squadron, and Nelton González Pomares. It was led by General Pedro Rodríguez Echavarria, at that time commander of the Santiago air base and the superior officers Pedro Santiago Rodríguez Echavarría and Federico Fernández Smester.

Members of the plot 
Manuel Durán Guzmán was born on September 28, 1924 in Villa Riva.  He studied at the Padre Fantino Jesuit seminary in Santo Cerro as a young man, then ventured into a military career in 1945.  He was the ideological leader and originator of the conspiracy.  His plan was to carry it out in the months following Rafael Trujillo's death but he could not do so due to the high risk in those early days of being denounced and arrested.

Raymundo Polanco Alegría was Durán Guzmán's first contact.  A member of Durán Guzmán's graduating class in 1948, Polanco-Alegría, of Almerian descent, was commander of the Ramfis Hunt Squadron and had under his command sixty aircraft of all types during the golden age of the Dominican Military Aviation.  He was one of the great aces of the Dominican Military Aviation. After the November 19 plot, he retired from military aviation and was designated as a military attaché in Europe.

Nelton González Pomares was another of Durán Guzmán's first contacts. He was the commander of the Hunting and Bombing Group. After the uprising, he was appointed as a military attache to Washington and later was Director of Dominicana de Aviacion.

Pedro Rafael Rodríguez Echavarría, brigadier general and commander of the Santiago Air Base, was convinced by Durán Guzmán to lead the plot due to the quality of his leadership, his prestige and his good relationships with other political and military leaders. He supported Balaguer in the creation of the first State Council. It is said that at the request of President John F. Kennedy, he was appointed on November 22 Secretary of State of the Armed Forces and his brother Pedro Santiago Rodríguez Echavarría as Chief of Staff of the Dominican Air Force.

References 

History of the Dominican Republic
Third Dominican Republic
Military history of the Dominican Republic
November 1961 events in North America
1961 in the Dominican Republic
Conflicts in 1961